The Brunswick River is a  tidal river in Glynn County, Georgia. It begins at the confluence of the South Brunswick River with the Turtle River southeast of Brunswick and flows east to St. Simons Sound, the strait between Saint Simons Island to the north and Jekyll Island to the south.

The Lanier Bridge crosses the Brunswick River, I-95 and Georgia State Route 303 cross the Turtle River, the Torres Causeway crosses St. Simons Sound, and the Jekyll Island Causeway crosses Jekyll Sound.

See also
List of rivers of Georgia

References 

USGS Hydrologic Unit Map - State of Georgia (1974)

External links
 
 South Brunswick River boat ramp
 Georgia DNR Turtle River and South Brunswick River
 NOAA nautical chart

Rivers of Georgia (U.S. state)
Rivers of Glynn County, Georgia